Tamba ochra is a noctuoid moth in the family Erebidae first, described by Louis Beethoven Prout in 1932. It inhabits lowland forests of Thailand, Peninsular Malaysia and Borneo.

References

Boletobiinae
Moths of Borneo
Moths of Asia
Moths of Malaysia
Moths described in 1932